France participated at the 2018 Summer Youth Olympics in Buenos Aires, Argentina from 6 October to 18 October 2018.

Archery

France qualified one archer based on its performance at the 2017 World Archery Youth Championships.

Individual

Team

Athletics

Badminton

France qualified two players based on the Badminton Junior World Rankings. 

Singles

Team

Basketball

France qualified a girls' team based on the U18 3x3 National Federation Ranking.

 Girls' tournament – 1 team of 4 athletes

Shoot-out contest

Boxing

Girls

Canoeing

France qualified three boats based on its performance at the 2018 World Qualification Event.

 Boys' K1 – 1 boat
 Girls' C1 – 1 boat
 Girls' K1 – 1 boat

Dancesport

France qualified two dancers based on its performance at the 2018 World Youth Breaking Championship.

 B-Boys – Martin
 B-Girls – Senorita Carlota

Diving

Fencing

France qualified two athletes based on its performance at the 2018 Cadet World Championship.

 Boys' Foil – Armand Spichiger
 Boys' Sabre – Samuel Jarry

Golf

Individual

Team

Gymnastics

Artistic
France qualified two gymnasts based on its performance at the 2018 European Junior Championship.

 Boys' artistic individual all-around – 1 quota
 Girls' artistic individual all-around – 1 quota

Rhythmic
France qualified one rhythmic gymnast based on its performance at the European qualification event.

 Girls' rhythmic individual all-around – 1 quota

Judo

Individual

Team

Karate

Modern pentathlon

France qualified two athletes based on its performance at the 2018 Youth A World Championship.

 Boys' Individual – Hugo Fleurot
 Girls' Individual – Emma Riff

Roller speed skating

France qualified two roller skaters based on its performance at the 2018 Roller Speed Skating World Championship.

 Boys' combined speed event – Ewen Foussadier
 Girls' combined speed event – Honorine Barrault

Rowing

France qualified one boat based on its performance at the 2017 World Junior Rowing Championships.

 Girls' single sculls – Lucine AHYI

Rugby sevens

Boys' tournament

Roster

Dorian Bellot
Erwan Dridi
Martin Dulon
Baptiste Germain
Sasha Gue
Théo Louvet
Yoram Moefana
Yann Peysson
Calum Randle
Cheikh Tiberghien
Joachim Trouabal
Tani Vili

Group Stage

Gold Medal Match

Girls' tournament

Roster

Axelle Berthoumieu
Alycia Christiaens
Mélanie Daumalle
Charlotte Escudero
Lucy Hapulat
Salomé Maran
Alice Muller
Lou Noel
Aurélie Plantefeve
Méline Puech
Celia Roue
Chloé Sanz

Group Stage

Gold Medal Match

Sailing

France qualified two boats based on its performance at the 2017 World Techno 293+ Championships. France later qualified two boats based on its performance at the 2018 IKA Twin Tip Racing Youth World Championship. A Nacra 15 boat was qualified based on their performance at the 2018 Nacra 15 World Championships.

 Boys' Techno 293+ – 1 boat
 Boys' IKA Twin Tip Racing – 1 boat
 Girls' Techno 293+ – 1 boat
 Girls' IKA Twin Tip Racing – 1 boat
 Mixed Nacra 15 – 1 boat

Shooting

France qualified one sport shooter based on its performance at the 2017 European Championships.

 Girls' 10m Air Pistol – 1 quota

Individual

Team

Sport climbing

France qualified two sport climbers based on its performance at the 2017 World Youth Sport Climbing Championships.

 Boys' combined – 2 quotas (Sam Avezou, Nathan Martin)

Swimming

Table tennis

France qualified one table tennis player based on its performance at the European Continental Qualifier. France later qualified a male player based on its performance at the Road to Buenos Aires (Europe) series.

 Boys' singles – Bastien Rembert
 Girls' singles – Lucie Gauthier

Tennis

Singles

Doubles

Triathlon

France qualified two athletes based on its performance at the 2018 European Youth Olympic Games Qualifier.

Individual

Relay

Wrestling

Key:
  – Victory by Fall
  – Without any points scored by the opponent

References

2018 in French sport
Nations at the 2018 Summer Youth Olympics
France at the Youth Olympics